Geek Girl is the debut novel of Holly Smale. It tells the story of Harriet Manners, a socially awkward 15 year old English girl with a limited circle of friends, a (now) super model boyfriend and who is the target of the school bully. Plucked from obscurity to be the face of a high-profile fashion advertising campaign, Manners' change of circumstance results in various conflicts which she must resolve and which in turn lead to revelations about both herself and the world in general.

The novel is partially based on Smale's own experiences as a teenage model. It won the Waterstones Children's Book Prize Teen category prize in 2014 along with the Leeds Book Award (11–14 category) for 2014, and has spawned a series of Geek Girl novels by Smale. 

In January 2023, Netflix gave a series order to adapt the novel into a 10-part television series, produced by Waterside Studios, Nelvana, RubyRock Pictures and Aircraft Pictures.

See also

References

External links 
  Leeds Book Awards Winners

British young adult novels
2013 British novels
Novels set in high schools and secondary schools
2013 debut novels
HarperCollins books